Madeleine is a 1950 British film noir directed by David Lean, based on a true story of Madeleine Smith, a young Glasgow woman from a wealthy family who was tried in 1857 for the murder of her lover, Emile L'Angelier. The trial was much publicised in the newspapers of the day and labelled "the trial of the century". Lean's adaptation of the story starred his wife, Ann Todd, with Ivan Desny as her character's French lover. Norman Wooland played the respectable suitor and Leslie Banks the authoritarian father, both of whom are unaware of Madeleine's secret life. Lean made the film primarily as a "wedding present" to Todd, who had previously played the role onstage. He was never satisfied with the film and cited it as his least favourite feature-length movie.

Plot
The film begins at 7 Blythswood Square, Glasgow, in a contemporary setting, then jumps back to the past in the early 19th century.

The film dramatises events leading up to the 1857 trial of an otherwise-respectable young woman, Madeleine Smith (Ann Todd), for the murder of her draper's-assistant and lover, Frenchman Emile L'Angelier (Ivan Desny). The trial produced the uniquely Scottish verdict of "not proven", which left Madeleine a free woman. The film begins with the purchase of a house in Glasgow by an upper middle-class Victorian family. Their eldest daughter Madeleine claims the basement bedroom so she will have easy access to the servants' entrance and be able to entertain her lover, without her family's knowledge.

The relationship continues and the couple becomes secretly engaged, but L'Angelier begins to press Madeleine to reveal his existence to her father, so they can marry. Frightened of her authoritarian father, Madeleine is reluctant to do so. Eventually, she visits L'Angelier in his room and says she will elope with him, rather than face telling her father. L'Angelier says he could never marry her this way. Madeleine now realises that he loves her not for herself, but only as a means to recover his position in society. She says their relationship is over and demands all her letters be returned.

During the time that Madeleine has been seeing L'Angelier, her father has been encouraging her to accept the attentions of a wealthy society gentleman, William Minnoch (Norman Wooland). After breaking her engagement with L'Angelier, Madeleine tells Mr. Minnoch that she will accept his marriage proposal. Her family is happy, but L'Angelier shows up threatening to show her father the compromising letters in his possession, unless she continues to see him. Saying nothing of her new engagement, Madeleine reluctantly agrees.

Some weeks later, L'Angelier becomes very ill.  He recovers, but later suffers a fatal relapse. When the cause of death is proven to be arsenic poisoning, a friend of L'Angelier points the finger of suspicion at Madeleine, who is found to have had arsenic in her possession at the time of L'Angelier's death. The remainder of the film covers the court case, finishing with the verdict of "not proven", a uniquely Scottish verdict which releases Madeleine from custody as neither guilty nor not guilty.

Cast
 Ann Todd as Madeleine Smith
 Norman Wooland as William Minnoch
 Ivan Desny as Emile L'Angelier
 Leslie Banks as Mr. James Smith
 Barbara Everest as Mrs. Smith
 Susan Stranks as Janet Smith
 Patricia Raine as Bessie Smith
 Elizabeth Sellars as Christina Hackett
 Edward Chapman as Dr. Thompson
 Jean Cadell as Mrs. Jenkins
 Eugene Deckers as Thuau
 André Morell as Defending Counsel
 Barry Jones as Prosecuting Counsel
 Ivor Barnard as Mr. Murdoch
 David Horne as Lord Justice-Clerk
 Henry Edwards as Clerk of the Court
 Amy Veness as Miss Aiken
 Kynaston Reeves as Dr. Penny
 Cameron Hall as Dr. Yeoman
 Anthony Newley as	Chemist's Assistant (uncredited)

Production
Charles Bennett wrote a version of the story, meaning to direct but his script was not used because David Lean wanted to make a version starring his wife Ann Todd.

References

External links
 
 
 

1950 films
Film noir
1950 crime drama films
British biographical films
British crime drama films
Films directed by David Lean
Films set in 1857
Films shot at Pinewood Studios
Films shot in Edinburgh
Films scored by William Alwyn
British historical films
1950s historical films
British black-and-white films
1950s English-language films
1950s British films